These are the ZPAV Polish Dance Club Singles number one hits of 2010.

Chart history

See also
List of number-one singles of 2010 (Poland)
List of number-one albums of 2010 (Poland)

References

Number-one singles
Poland
Dance 2010